is a Japanese foil and sabre fencer. He competed at the 1964 and 1968 Summer Olympics.

References

External links
 

1940 births
Living people
Japanese male foil fencers
Olympic fencers of Japan
Fencers at the 1964 Summer Olympics
Fencers at the 1968 Summer Olympics
Sportspeople from Tokyo
Japanese male sabre fencers
Fellows of the American Physical Society